Iguododo is a populated town and is located in Orhionmwon Local Government Area in Edo State, Nigeria.

Notable people
 Oba of Benin.
 Major Ise-erien (Rtd), Retired Major Nigerian Army.
 Pastor Osagie Ize-Iyamu, Politician, Pastor and Former Secretary to Edo State Government.

References

Populated places in Edo State